La Ley is an Argentinian law publisher that has existed since before World War II. Since October 2000, it has been a member of the Thomson Legal & Regulatory group within The Thomson Corporation (reorganized in October 2006 as Thomson International Legal and Regulatory).

External links
Home page (in Spanish)
Thomson press release, January 2004

Thomson Reuters

Publishing companies of Argentina